Chrysotoxum festivum is a species of hoverfly.

Identification
External images
For terms see Morphology of Diptera
Wing length 8·25–12 mm. Wing with a small, square, dark spot. Thorax with two grey longitudinal stripes. Katepisternum normally with yellow spot. Apical antennomere shorter than antennomeres 1 and 2 together.

Keys and accounts 
Coe R.L. (1953) Syrphidae 
Van Veen, M. (2004) Hoverflies of Northwest Europe 
Van der Goot,V.S. (1981) De zweefvliegen van Noordwest - Europa en Europees Rusland, in het bijzonder van de Benelux
Bei-Bienko, G.Y. & Steyskal, G.C. (1988) Keys to USSR insects. Diptera

Distribution
Palaearctic Fennoscandia South to Iberia and the Mediterranean basin. Ireland eastwards through Europe into Greece, Turkey and European Russia then through Siberia to the Pacific coast. Japan. North India.

Biology

Habitat :Deciduous woodland clearings and open areas in scrub woodland. Grassland with scrub. Flowers visited include white umbellifers, Calluna, Chaerophyllum, Cirsium arvense, Euphorbia, Galium, Hieracium, Hypochoeris, Narthecium, Origanum, Potentilla erecta, Ranunculus, Rosa rugosa, Rubus idaeus, Sambucus nigra, Senecio, Solidago canadensis and Solidago virgaurea.

The flight period is May to September, with peaks in June and August.

References

External links
Biolib

Flies described in 1758
Diptera of Europe
Syrphinae
Taxa named by Carl Linnaeus